Muhammad Din Fauq was a historian of Kashmir. He was a pioneer of journalism in Jammu and Kashmir.

To espouse the cause of the Kashmiris as well as to extend solidarity, various organisations were formed before Partition of India. Prominent among them were the All India Muslim Kashmiri Conference and the All India Kashmir Committee. The former was established at Lahore in 1908 with Allama Iqbal and Muhammad Din Fauq as its prominent leaders.

He wrote extensively on the Valley's history, folklore and geography. He published a history of Kashmir in 1910. In 1936 Fauq published an exhaustive survey on the origins and histories of Kashmir's well known families and communities. The survey has been described as being of considerable interest from the anthropological point of view.

References

Leaders of the Pakistan Movement
Kashmiri people
People from Sialkot
Date of birth missing
Date of death missing